John Marshall Elementary School is a historic elementary school located in the Frankford neighborhood of Philadelphia, Pennsylvania. It is part of the School District of Philadelphia. The building was designed by Henry deCourcy Richards and built in 1909–1910. It is a three-story, five-bay by three-bay, brick building on a raised basement in the Colonial Revival style. It has a three-story, rear brick addition built in 1922. It features a pedimented cornice, brick parapet, projecting central section, and a two-story arched opening above the main entrance. The school was named for Chief Justice John Marshall.

The building was added to the National Register of Historic Places in 1988.

References

External links

School buildings on the National Register of Historic Places in Philadelphia
Colonial Revival architecture in Pennsylvania
School buildings completed in 1910
Frankford, Philadelphia
Public elementary schools in Philadelphia
School District of Philadelphia